The men's K-1 5000 metres competition at the 2022 ICF Canoe Sprint World Championships in Dartmouth took place on Lake Banook.

Schedule
The schedule is as follows:

Results
As a long-distance event, it was held as a direct final.

References

ICF